Jacuí municipality in the state of Minas Gerais in the Southeast region of Brazil.
 Salto do Jacuí is a municipality in the state Rio Grande do Sul, Brazil.
 Vila Jacuí, district in the subprefecture of São Miguel Paulista in São Paulo, Brazil.
 Jacuí River, river in Rio Grande do Sul state of southern Brazil.
 Jacuí River, river of São Paulo state in southeastern Brazil. 
 Jacuí-Mirim River, river of Rio Grande do Sul state in southern Brazil.